Accordion Noir is the name of a music festival and radio show from Vancouver, Canada.

Bruce Triggs and Rowan Lipkovits started Accordion Noir in December 2006 as an accordion-themed radio show on the Vancouver community radio station CFRO-FM. The festival began in 2007 and has been an annual event since then.

Past Performers 

 Geoff Berner, who was an inspiration for starting the festival, and who has launched albums and books at the festival
 The Creaking Planks
 Fang
 Antii Paalanen
 Iva Nova
 Patrick Farrell and Ben Holmes
 Renée De la Prade
 Orkestar Slivovica
 Demon Squadron
 Miss Murgatroid
 Nefertiti in the Kitchen
 Jason Webley
 Wendy McNeill

References

External links 

Accordion Noir Society
Accordion Noir festival website
Squeezebox Circle - a monthly gathering of accordionists connected with Accordion Noir, which has been running since 2007.

Music festivals in British Columbia